CDOS may refer to:

 Cromemco DOS (CDOS), an CP/M-like operating system
 Concurrent DOS (CDOS), a Digital Research operating system based on Concurrent CP/M-86 since 1984
 Collateralized debt obligation (CDOs), a type of structured asset-backed security

See also 
COS (disambiguation)
DOS (disambiguation)